Ptilophora jezoensis is a moth of the family Notodontidae. It is known from Japan and the Russian Far East.

The wingspan is 30–35 mm.

Subspecies
Ptilophora jezoensis jezoensis (Japan)
Ptilophora jezoensis sutchana O.Bang-Haas, 1927 (Amur, Primorye)

External links
Japanese Moths

Notodontidae
Moths of Japan